Heliodora Carneiro de Mendonça (August 29, 1923 – April 10, 2015), better known by her pseudonym Bárbara Heliodora, was a Brazilian theatre critic, writer and translator, specialized in the works of William Shakespeare.

She was awarded by the Ministry of Culture of France with the Ordre des Arts et des Lettres.

Biography
She was born on August 29, 1923. Her parents were Anna Amélia and Marcos Carneiro de Mendonça. Heliodora began theatre criticism at age 35.

Heliodora died on April 10, 2015.

References

1923 births
2015 deaths
Brazilian theatre critics
Writers from Rio de Janeiro (city)
Shakespearean scholars
Brazilian translators
Brazilian critics
20th-century translators
20th-century Brazilian women writers
21st-century translators
21st-century Brazilian women writers
21st-century Brazilian writers
Women critics